Agfa is the only genus in the parasitic nematode family, Agfidae. There are only three known species: Agfa flexilis, A. morandi and A. tauricus. They are all obligate parasites in terrestrial gastropods.

Species 
 Agfa flexilis (Dujardin, 1845)
 Agfa morandi Ribas & Casanova, 2002
 Agfa tauricus Korol & Spiridonov, 1991

References 

Rhabditida genera
Agfidae